The 2013 Damallsvenskan, part of the 2013 Swedish football season, is the 26th season of Damallsvenskan since its establishment in 1988. The season began on 13 April 2013 and ends on 20 October 2013.  Tyresö FF are the defending champions, having won their first title the previous season.

A total of 12 teams played in the league; 10 returned from the 2012 season and 2 were promoted from Division 1.

Teams 
Djurgårdens IF and AIK were relegated at the end of the 2012 season after finishing in the bottom two places of the table. They were replaced by Division 1 division champions Sunnanå SK and Mallbackens IF.

League table
Tyresö FF, second placed team in 2013 Damallsvenskan, would have qualified for the Champions League, but renounced its place after economic problems. As a result, the berth was given to Linköpings FC, the third placed team of the league.

Results

Season statistics
Updated as of matches played on 20 October 2013.

Top scorers

Top assists

References

External links 
 
  

Damallsvenskan seasons
1
Dam
Sweden
Sweden